Badshah Begum is a 2022 Pakistani television historical drama series produced by Rafay Rashdi and Momina Duraid under the banners of Rafay Rashdi Productions and MD Productions, written by Saji Gul and directed by Khizer Idrees. It revolves around the era when Mughal Empire was in power and the concept of "Badshah Begum" has the most priority. Story revolves around politics, power lust and rivalry among the siblings to get the throne. It features Zara Noor Abbas, Farhan Saeed, Ali Rehman Khan, Yasir Hussain, Shahzad Nawaz, Komal Meer and Saman Ansari in prominent roles. The series first aired on Hum TV on 1 March 2022 and the last episode aired 18 October 2022.

Plot 
The drama is set in the fictional village of Peeraan Pur (Interior Sindh-Larkana) which tells the real concept of Gaddi and Politics. When undesired circumstances force his city-born and raised children Jahan Ara, Roshan and Shahmir to their hometown, they find themselves tangled in powerplay and politics that they never wished to be a part of. What follows in an epic tale of dynastic politics, sibling rivalry and anarchy.

Badshah Begum is based on true historical incidents which took place during the 16th and 17th centuries. The characters of Jahan Ara and Roshan Ara are based on the historical figures which lived during the Mughal Empire. They were daughters of the fifth Mughal emperor Shah Jahan, Jahanara Begum and Roshanara Begum. Jahanara was the most honorable Badshah Begum of that time who established herself in the Agra Fort. The drama highlights incidents that occurred during the rule of Jahanara Begum.

Cast

Episodes

 Episode 1 | 1 March 2022
 Episode 2 | 8 March 2022
 Episode 3 | 15 March 2022
 Episode 4 | 22 March 2022
 Episode 5 | 29 March 2022
 Episode 6 | 5 April 2022
 Episode 7 | 12 April 2022
 Episode 8 | 19 April 2022
 Episode 9 | 26 April 2022
 Episode 10 | 10 May 2022
 Episode 11 | 17 May 2022
 Episode 12 | 24 May 2022
 Episode 13 | 31 May 2022
 Episode 14 | 7 June 2022
 Episode 15 | 14 June 2022
 Episode 16 | 21 June 2022
 Episode 17 | 28 June 2022
 Episode 18 | 5 July 2022
 Episode 19 | 19 July 2022
 Episode 20 | 26 July 2022
 Episode 21 | 2 August 2022
 Episode 22 | 16 August 2022
 Episode 23 | 23 August 2022
 Episode 24 | 30 August 2022
 Episode 25 | 6 September 2022
 Episode 26 | 13 September 2022
 Episode 27 | 20 September 2022
 Episode 28 | 27 September 2022
 Episode 29 | 6 October 2022
 Episode 30 | 11 October 2022
 Last Episode | 18 October 2022

Reception
Minutes before its launch, the serial trended at number 1 on twitter along with Zara Noor Abbas, Farhan Saeed and Yasir Hussain as well. The first episode achieved decent ratings of 5.8 TRP and mixed response from audience and social media users. However, while reviewing first episode, critics lauded the direction and performances of the cast members. After airing 6 episodes, Youline Magazine praised the performances of almost all the actors but criticised the, writing, executional lapses and slow pace. The story was however praised stating, "On paper, the story certainly has good bones".

Production

Development and casting 
After making his big screen debut as producer and director, Rafay Rashdi started working on his next project in late 2017 which was written by Saji Gul. Saba Qamar was selected to play the main role. It was then decided to release as a web-series with other actors until early 2019 including Faysal Quraishi, Imran Ashraf, Mohsin Abbas Haider and Gohar Rasheed. Qamar was then replaced by Iman Ali after which the project was shelved due to some unknown reasons. In late 2021, the work on the project restarted with Farhan Saeed revealed to be a part of the project and it was changed to a television series under the banner of MD Productions of Momina Duraid and Rafay Rashdi Production. Zara Noor Abbas was chosen to play the main role, earlier offered to Ali. In early 2022, it was also announced that Yasir Hussain and Ali Rehman Khan had also joined the cast with other cast members of Saman Ansari, Shahzad Nawaz, Hamza Sohail, Komal Meer, Hiba Aziz and Abul Hassan.

Filming and location 
The principal photography began in Larkana in October 2021 with a spell of 90 days on the ancestral Haveli of the producer, Rashdi. After that, the filming also took place in Karachi.

Release and promotion 
The first teaser was released on 2 February 2022 while the original soundtrack was released on 24 February 2022.

The series premiered on 1 March 2022, Tuesdays with a timeslot of 08:00pm by succeeding Ibn-e-Hawwa, while Ibn-e-Hawwa moved to Saturdays, as Qissa Meherbano Ka ended.

References 

2022 Pakistani television series debuts